Pariyan may refer to:
 Pariyan, Hamadan
 Pariyan, Kermanshah

See also
 Ghar-e-Pariyan, a cave near Isfahan